The Leptonetoidea are a superfamily of haplogyne araneomorph spiders with three families. Phylogenetic studies have provided weak support for the relationship among the families. The placement of one of the families within the Haplogynae has been questioned.

Phylogeny
Leptonoidea has been circumscribed to contain the following families:
 Leptonetidae
 Ochyroceratidae
 Telemidae

The three families have been placed in the Haplogynae, one of the two main groups of araneomorph spiders, with the internal relationships as in the following cladogram. The clade has only weak support.

Subsequent to the analyses that produced the relationships shown above, it was discovered that one leptonetid genus, Archoleptoneta, has a cribellum. Placing Leptonetidae as a derived member of the Haplogynae would require independent evolution of the cribellum. Other characters also suggest that leptonetids are "proto-entelegynes", belonging on their own in a superfamily.

References

Araneomorphae